The Caribbean Electric Utility Services Corporation (CARILEC) is an association of electric energy solution providers operating in the electricity industry in the Caribbean, Central and Southern Americas.

CARILEC's Mission is to enhance the effectiveness of its members by providing industry related services, creating regular networking, training and knowledge sharing opportunities; supporting mutual assistance programs and accelerating the Caribbean Region’s energy sector transition, through innovation and advocacy.

History 
CARILEC was established in 1989 with nine members as part of an electric utilities modernization project funded by USAID and implemented by NRECA under a five-year "Co-operative Agreement."

Currently, CARILEC comprises over one hundred members members. This includes thirty three Utility Members that are electric utilities, Seven Independent Power Providers and over fifty Associate and Affiliate Members that are companies involved in some aspect of servicing the electric utility business.

Full Members 
Anguilla Electricity Company Ltd
Antigua Public Utilities Authority
Aqualectra
Bahamas Power and Light Company
Barbados Light and Power Company
Belize Electricity Ltd.
Bermuda Electric Light Company Ltd.
British Virgin Islands Electricity Corporation
Caribbean Utilities Company Ltd.
Consorcio Energético Punta Cana-Macao
Dominica Electricity Services Ltd.
EDF - Archipel Guadeloupe
EDF - Martinique
Fortis TCI Formerly Provo Power Company
Grand Bahama Power Company Ltd.
Grenada Electricity Services Ltd.
Guyana Power & Light Inc.
Jamaica Public Service Company Ltd.
Montserrat Utility Ltd.
Nevis Electricity Company Ltd.
N.V. Electriciteit-Maatschappij (Aruba)
N.V. G.E.B.E.
N.V. Energiebedrijven Suriname
Roatan Electric Company S.A. DE C.V
Saba Electric Company.
St. Kitts Electricity Company Ltd.
St. Lucia Electricity Services Ltd.
St. Eustatius Utility Company
St. Vincent Electricity Services Ltd.
Trinidad & Tobago Electricity Commission
Virgin Islands Water & Power Authority
Water En Energiebedrijf Aruba N.V.
Water en Energiebedrijf Bonaire N.V.

Other members - https://www.carilec.org/members/

Leadership 
According to the CARILEC by-laws provision is made for the appointment of a Board of Directors comprising not more than (15) and not less than (3) members to be responsible for policy governance. A Director shall be the Chief Executive/Operating Officer or a senior professional staff of a member utility. Provision is also made for the Directors to elect a Chairman and Vice Chairman from among them. Currently, the Board of Directors of CARILEC comprises a fifteen (15) member team. Thirteen (13) of the Directors are elected at the annual meeting of members from among the Utility Members for a term of three years each, while one Director is elected to serve as a representative of the Associate Members for a period of one year. The Board also comprises an ex-officio Executive Director who is responsible for the day-to-day administration of the Secretariat located in Saint Lucia and serves as the Company Secretary/Treasurer.

Utility companies of the Caribbean
Public utilities by region